Pseudophilautus stuarti, known as Stuart's shrub frog, is a species of frogs in the family Rhacophoridae. It is endemic to Sri Lanka.

Its natural habitat is subtropical or tropical moist montane forests.
It is threatened by habitat loss.

References

stuarti
Endemic fauna of Sri Lanka
Frogs of Sri Lanka
Amphibians described in 2005
Taxonomy articles created by Polbot